The University of Trinidad and Tobago, also known as UTT, is a state owned university in Trinidad and Tobago established in 2004.  Its main campus, currently under construction, will be located at Wallerfield in Trinidad. Presently, its campuses are an amalgamation of several former technological colleges throughout the country.

It is one of three universities in Trinidad and Tobago, the others being the University of the West Indies and University of the Southern Caribbean.

Board of Governors
The University is headed by a board of governors. The current board consists of:

 Chairman - Professor Kenneth S. Julien (Emeritus)
 Professor Clement A. C. Imbert
 Professor Hollis Liverpool
 Nicolin Carol Moore
 Shivan Ojah-Maharaj
 Jerome Dookie
 Orville Carrington
 Michael Patrick Cooper
 Ulric McNicol Esq.

Campuses

The University is a multi-campus facility with major campuses located as follows :

 Camden Campus
 O'Meara Campus
 Valsayn Campus
 Corinth Campus
 Chaguanas Campus
 Point Lisas Campus 
 John S. Donaldson Campus (Rebranded as the Creativity Campus) 
 San Fernando Campus
 Chaguaramas Campus
 Tobago Campus 
 The Eastern Caribbean Institute of Agriculture and Forestry (E.C.I.A.F.)
 Tamana InTech Park, Wallerfield, site of the University's Signature Complex and Main Campus. Construction has started, but the complex is not yet finished.

References

External links
University of Trinidad and Tobago

Universities in Trinidad and Tobago
Forestry education
Educational institutions established in 2004
2004 establishments in Trinidad and Tobago